Mahaprabhu is a 1996 Indian Tamil-language masala film directed by A. Venkatesh, making his directorial debut. The film stars R. Sarathkumar, Sukanya and Vineetha. It was released on 26 January 1996.

Plot

Dhamodaran sells black cinema tickets alongside his friends Sedhu and Vicky. Dhamodaran is known to be an angry man thus he promises to his mother Vellaiyamma to avoid violence. Jothi, Dhamodaran's cousin, is deeply in love with Dhamodaran.

Shanmugavel, a corrupt politician, is an influential man and even the police cannot arrest him for his crimes. His son Bhaskar spreads terror among the college students. Eswarapandiyan, an honest police officer, is determined to arrest Shanmugavel. Later, Uma, Eswarapandiyan 's wife, is killed by Shanmugavel and Eswarapandian is left for dead.

Thereafter, Mahalakshmi moves into the house opposite to Dhamodaran's house. Mahalakshmi is an orphan and becomes a college lecturer. Dhamodaran falls in love with her but Mahalakshmi advises him to first become a decent man. Dhamodaran then becomes a mechanic and he also changes his behaviour. In the meantime, Bhaskar loses the college's chairman election mainly due to Mahalakshmi, who supported the other contestant. After seeing Mahalakshmi and Dhamodaran's love, Jothi sacrifices her love and she decides to marry another man.

Soon, Dhamodaran clashes with Bhaskar's henchmen to save his lover Mahalakshmi. When Bhaskar tries to undress Mahalakshmi, Vellaiyamma interferes and she is pushed into a sewer. Mahalakshmi then sets herself on fire. Dhamodaran comes too late and discovers their dead bodies. He then turns berserk and kills Bhaskar. Dhamodaran is later arrested by the police and Shanmugavel challenges Dhamodaran to kill him.

Eswarapandiyan then saves Dhamodaran from the police. What transpires later forms the crux of the story.

Cast

R. Sarathkumar as Dhamodaran aka Dhamu
Sukanya as Mahalakshmi
Vineetha as Jothi
Manorama as Vellaiyamma, Dhamodaran's mother
Sarath Babu as Eswarapandiyan (police inspector)
Goundamani as Sedhu
Senthil as Vicky
Rajan P. Dev as Shanmugavel
Vaishnavi as Uma, Eswarapandiyan's wife
Vishal as Bhaskar
Ennatha Kannaiya as Mahalakshmi's father
Ajay Rathnam as police inspector 
Raviraj
Krishnamoorthy
K. K. Soundar as Jothi's father
Kumarimuthu as Gnana Kannan
Judge Rajagopal
Kovai Senthil
Master Mahendran
Nellai Siva as Local politician
Vikram Krishna (cameo)

Production
Since their previous film I Love India (1993) failed at box-office, Sarathkumar decided to collaborate again with Reddy for another film which eventually became Mahaprabhu. The film marked the directorial debut of A. Venkatesh and it is said to be based on a real life event which happened when he worked as reporter for Maalai Malar.

Soundtrack

The film score and the soundtrack were composed by Deva. The soundtrack, released in 1996, features six tracks with lyrics written by Vaali.

Legacy
The film's success established Venkatesh as a film director and he went on to direct more films while he again collaborated with Sarathkumar in films like Aai (2004), Chanakya (2005) and Sandamarutham (2015). Senthil's dialogue "No Comments Simbly Waste" entered Tamil vernacular, often used by people when tired of responding to questions.

References

1996 films
1990s masala films
Indian films about revenge
Films scored by Deva (composer)
1990s Tamil-language films
1996 directorial debut films
Films directed by A. Venkatesh (director)